Sunnybrook, also known as the Sunnybrook Park & Ballroom, Sunnybrook Convention Center: Colonial Restaurant, is a historic ballroom and restaurant located at Lower Pottsgrove Township, Montgomery County, Pennsylvania. It was built in 1931 and expanded in 1937, and is a 26,000 square foot, one-story utilitarian frame building with exaggerated ceiling heights under various roof angles and heights. It was expanded again in 1964 with the addition of the Colonial Restaurant and in 1998 with a brewery/pub. Also on the property is a contributing two-story, frame bath house built in 1926.  The buildings are part of the Sunnybrook Picnic Park complex.

It was added to the National Register of Historic Places in 2005.

References

External links
Sunny Brook homepage

Commercial buildings on the National Register of Historic Places in Pennsylvania
Commercial buildings completed in 1931
Commercial buildings completed in 1937
Houses completed in 1926
Buildings and structures in Montgomery County, Pennsylvania
National Register of Historic Places in Montgomery County, Pennsylvania